Greg Anderson (born March 14, 1961 in Duluth, Minnesota) is a current NHRA Camping World Drag Racing Series Pro Stock owner and driver for KB Racing, driving the Hendrick Automotive Group Chevrolet Camaro. He began his Pro Stock career in 1998. Greg previously served as Crew Chief for former pro stock champion Warren Johnson and tuned Warren to three pro stock championships (1992–93, 1995). Anderson is married to wife Kimberly and the couple have two children, Brittany and Cody. He resides in Concord, North Carolina.  Anderson took over KB Racing from Keith Black at the end of the 2022 season.

Awards
Five-time NHRA Camping World Pro Stock World Champion (2003–05, 2010, 2021). 
Three-time Pro Stock champion as crew chief (1992–93, 1995).
100 career Pro Stock wins.
2004 Speed Driver of the Year.
In 2004 set NHRA Single Season Records in Round Wins (76), Wins (15), Final Rounds (19/23 races) #1 Qualifiers (16)
Six time NHRA U. S. Nationals winner (2000, '03, '04, '05, '06, '22).
1999: Became seventh member of the Speed Pro 200-mph Pro Stock Club with a 200.11-mph pass (Richmond).

References

Anderson's profile from KB Racing
Anderson's profile from NHRA
Anderson's profile from Summit Racing

Living people
1961 births
Sportspeople from Duluth, Minnesota
Racing drivers from Minnesota